Eugenio Tadeu is a Brazilian  grappler, Vale Tudo and mixed martial arts fighter.   Tadeu was born in 1965. He was famous as a practitioner of Luta Livre, or Brazilian Submission wrestling and was one of the last representatives of this art form.

Gracie rivalry
In the JJ vs Martial Arts Challenge in 1984, Tadeu defeated Renan Pitanguy by TKO. In 1988 he fought Royler Gracie to a draw. He was scheduled to fight Ralph Gracie but this never materialized.  This was because Tadeu did not submit his visa in time. Tadeu fought Royler Gracie to an hour long draw.

Renzo Gracie fight 
His most famous fight was with Renzo Gracie.  Renzo and Tadeu were long time rivals.  The rivalry has been described as being a Hatfield vs McCoy style rivalry because in South America machismo is the rule.  Renzo once said My name is not a bone to be carried in the jaw of a dog," before slapping the guy and declaring  "you don't deserve my fist." This was Renzo's last bare knuckle fight.  The riot from this fight led to MMA being banned from Rio de Janeiro.  Renzo claimed he was dominating the fight, but was having issues due to the oil that was on Tadeu's body.  After 15 minutes Renzo refused to rise and beckoned Tadau to grapple.  Renzo punched a fan in the face, causing more fans to riot.  The fight has been ranked one of the best fights to be ruled a no contest.  The riot was featured on World's Dumbest Criminals and is listed as the #8 Worst Moment In MMA History by ESPN.

Mixed martial arts record

|-
|Loss
|align=center| 2–3 (1)
|Marcelo Giudici
|TKO (corner stoppage)
|Meca World Vale Tudo 8
|
|align=center|2
|align=center|5:00
|Curitiba, Brazil
|
|-
|Loss
|align=center| 2–2 (1)
|Mikey Burnett
|TKO (punches)
|UFC 16 
|
|align=center|1
|align=center|9:46
|Kenner, Louisiana
|
|-
|NC
|align=center| 2–1 (1)
|Renzo Gracie
|NC (fans rioted)
|Pentagon Combat
|
|align=center|1
|align=center|14:45
|Rio de Janeiro, Brazil
|
|-
|Win
|align=center| 2–1
|Nigel Scantelbury 
|Submission (kimura)
|UVF 3
|
|align=center|1
|align=center|2:20
|Tokyo, Japan
|
|-
|Loss
|align=center| 1–1
|Wallid Ismail
|TKO (injury)
|Desafio - Jiu-Jitsu vs. Luta Livre
|
|align=center|1
|align=center|16:18
|Rio de Janeiro, Brazil
|
|-
|Win
|align=center| 1–0
|Renan Pitanguy
|TKO (corner stoppage)
|Desafio - Jiu-Jitsu vs. Martial Arts
|
|align=center|1
|align=center|5:02
|Rio de Janeiro, Brazil
|
|-

References

External links
 
 

Sportspeople from California
Living people
American male mixed martial artists
Mixed martial artists utilizing catch wrestling
Mixed martial artists utilizing Luta Livre
Mixed martial artists utilizing vale tudo
People from Los Angeles
Year of birth missing (living people)
Brazilian male mixed martial artists
American catch wrestlers
Brazilian catch wrestlers
Ultimate Fighting Championship male fighters